KAML (990 AM) is an American radio station broadcasting a Spanish contemporary Christian format. Licensed to Kenedy-Karnes City, Texas, it serves the San Antonio area. KGBC's Texas sister stations with SIGA Broadcasting include KTMR (1130 AM, Converse), KLVL (1480 AM, Pasadena), KGBC (1540 AM, Galveston), KHFX (1140 AM, Cleburne), and KFJZ (870 AM, Fort Worth).

990 AM is a Canadian clear-channel frequency.

External links

AML
Radio stations established in 1974
1974 establishments in Texas